Mosese Bogisa (born 27 April 1922, date of death unknown) was a Fijian former cricketer. Bogisa was a right-handed batsman.

Bogisa made his first-class debut for Fiji in 1948 against Auckland during Fiji's 1947/48 tour of New Zealand, where he played five first-class matches in total. Bogsia's final first-class match for Fiji came in their 1953/54 tour to New Zealand where he played a single first-class match against Otago.

In his 6 first-class matches for Fiji he scored 152 runs at a batting average of 12.66, with a high score of 33. Bogisa took 2 catches in the field.

Bogisa also represented Fiji in 15 non first-class matches from 1948 to 1954, with his final match for Fiji coming against Bay of Plenty during their 1953/54 tour of New Zealand.

Bogisa is deceased.

References

External links
Mosese Bogisa at Cricinfo
Mosese Bogisa at CricketArchive

1922 births
Year of death missing
Fijian cricketers
I-Taukei Fijian people
Sportspeople from Nadi